The Long Goodbye is the second album by indie rock band The Essex Green. It was released in May 2003 on Merge Records.

Track listing
"By the Sea"
"The Late Great Cassiopia"
"Our Lady in Havana"
"Lazy May"
"Southern States"
"Julia"
"Old Dominion"
"Sorry River"
"Chartiers"
"Whetherman"
"The Boo Hoo Boy"
"Berlin"

The Essex Green albums
2003 albums